Cordillacris crenulata, known generally as the crenulated grasshopper or crenulatewinged grasshopper, is a species of slant-faced grasshopper in the family Acrididae. It is found in North America.

References

Further reading

 

Acrididae
Articles created by Qbugbot
Insects described in 1889